Cadmium sulfate is the name of a series of related inorganic compounds with the formula CdSO4·H2O.  The most common form is the monohydrate CdSO4·H2O, but two other forms are known CdSO4·H2O and the anhydrous salt (CdSO4). All salts are colourless and highly soluble in water.

Structure, preparation, and occurrence

X-ray crystallography shows that CdSO4·H2O is a typical coordination polymer.  Each Cd2+ center has octahedral coordination geometry, being surrounded by four oxygen centers provided by four sulfate ligands and two oxygen centers from the bridging water ligands.

Cadmium sulfate hydrate can be prepared by the reaction of cadmium metal or its oxide or hydroxide with dilute sulfuric acid:
 CdO + H2SO4 → CdSO4 + H2O
 Cd + H2SO4 → CdSO4 + H2
The anhydrous material can be prepared using sodium persulfate:
 Cd + Na2S2O8   →   CdSO4  +  Na2SO4

Cadmium sulfates occur as the following rare minerals drobecite (CdSO4·4H2O), voudourisite (monohydrate), and lazaridisite (the 8/3-hydrate).

Applications
Cadmium sulfate is used widely for the electroplating of cadmium in electronic circuits. It is also a precursor to cadmium-based pigment such as cadmium sulfide. It is also used for electrolyte in a Weston standard cell as well as a pigment in fluorescent screens.

References

Cadmium compounds
Sulfates